Dhamankhel धामणखेल is a village situated at about 3 km from Junnar city of Pune district. There is a famous Dhamankhel kulaswami धामणखेल khandoba mandir at dhamankhel village धामणखेल. It is family deity of all village  families in this village.

Five kilometers away from this village there are the Lenyadri caves which is one of Ashtavinayaka temple in Maharashtra. Also about 3 kilometers away there is Shivneri fort a historic military fortification located near Junnar.

Festivals celebrated In "Shree Martand Bhairav Khandoba" Mandir.

Annually 4 festivals are being celebrated with great enthusiasm & bhakti. They are as follows.

1. Champashashti (Wangasat)
2. Magh Poornima
3. Chaitra Poornima

Champashathi is a day when Lord Khandoba takes a big sword (Khadag) in his hand to kill demon "Mani & Malya" therefore he known as "Khandoba". This is a day when Lord Shiva took an Avatar of Shri Khandoba.

This celebration start from one week or 7 days before Champashasti Day. Seven day series known as "Saptah" where bhajans & Kirtans (enchanting of Lord Names) took place. Champashashti Day starts with a big Hoam & Havan at the temple place in the early Morning (4:00 a.m). Then holy bath of Lord Khandoba.
As soon as Hoam & Havan finished Aarti of Khandoba is perform (6:00 a.m). Then temple is open for the darshan to all devotees.

After that a Lord Khandoba is placed in the Palakhi & is moved around the temple. After completing its journey it is kept in the middle of the temple for darshan purposes. Mahaprasad is distributed to all devotees after completion of "Kalyache Kirtan". The whole day devotes perform "Jagaran & Gondhal" in the temple rooms. This is a very joyful and holistic day of every devotee's life.

Magh Poornima is celebrated on the full moon day i.e. poornima of the Magh (Marathi calendar month, as per English calendar it generally falls in February or March) month of the year. Celebration starts with the holy bath of deity Shree Khandoba(Avatar taken by Lord Shiva to destroy the daemons Mani and Malla) in the early morning. After the pooja and other holy prarthnas temple is opened for darshan. People from surrounding areas and long distances visit this place every year and pay their offerings in the form of Aggarbattis, Gulal, Bhandar, etc. Another important ritual of this procession is "Harture" (Har means Mala made up of flowers) starts form a specific point(generally from Valunj Baba Temple). Bullock carts are decorated for this procession. Bullocks carts that consist of 4 bullocks is treated like a "Rath" of deity (Shree Khandoba). Yellow flags are put on both the sides of the bullock cart. People gather in large crowds for this special occasion. The procession is followed by local musicians & dancers performing traditional lezim dances in front of Harture. These dances continue till the Harture reaches Khandoba Temple.

Another major attraction of this festival is the bullock cart racing competition that starts at 10:30 a.m. This is one of the most famous activities among all the people gathered for the occasion, four bullocks have to reach the final destination within stipulated time allotted. The Bullock Cart which completes the race with the least time is being declared a winner. This is one of the most adventurous and interesting activity of the festival. The people gathered around are full of excitement, joy and enthusiasm. It is difficult to find out such levels of excitement anywhere else. The competition continues till night descends or sometimes the next day, too. While some people enjoy the race at one side, the other side of the temple is full of devotees taking the darshan of Lord Khandoba. The day is full of enthusiasm and happiness in the air.

Families living there
Jadhav
Konde
Varpe
Gunjal
Raghatwan
Jadhav

Getting there
One can reach Dhamankhel धामणखेलfrom Mumbai or Pune in the following ways:
 State transport buses are available for Junnar from the Shivajinagar bus stand of Pune, Kalyan ST bus stand in Thane district and from the Mumbai Central bus stand of Mumbai. Dhamankhel धामणखेलis 4 km from Junnar. Jeeps and buses are available from the Junnar bus stand for travel to Dhamankhel धामणखेल.
 On the Pune-Nasik Highway, Dhamankhel धामणखेल  is 90 km from Pune. If direct bus to Junnar is not available then you can reach at Narayangaon. From Narayangaon you can catch a bus. Also a mini bus facility is available from Narayangaon every 15 minutes.

Villages in Pune district